This is a list of surface-to-air missiles (SAMs).

World War II 
 Enzian – Nazi Germany
 Wasserfall – Nazi Germany
 Rheintochter – Nazi Germany
 Funryu – Empire of Japan

Modern systems

China 
 TY-90
 QW-3
 FN-6
 KS-1 (missile)
 HQ-9
 HQ-9A
 HQ-9B
 HHQ-9
 HQ-22
 HQ-16
 HQ-17
 HQ-17AE
 HQ-7
 HQ-10
 HQ-19
 FM-3000
 FT-2000
 HQ-15/HQ-18 (Chinese copy of S-300 missile system)

France 
 R440 Crotale
 R460 SICA
 Masurca
 Roland 1
 Roland 2
 Roland 3
 Mistral 1
 Mistral 2
 Mistral 3
 VT1
 VL MICA
 Aster 15
 Aster 30

Germany 
 ASRAD (Stinger, RBS-70 mk2, Igla, Mistral, Starburst missiles) land-based VSHORAD system
 ASRAD-2 land-based VSHORAD system
 IRIS-T SL
 LFK NG

Greece 
 Aris AA missile system

India 
 Akash
 Akash-NG
 QRSAM
 VL-SRSAM
 SAMAR Air Defence System
 VSHORAD (India)
 Barak 8 
 MR-SAM
 LR-SAM
 XRSAM
 Prithvi Air Defence 
 Advanced Air Defence
 Prithvi Defence Vehicle
 Prithvi Defence Vehicle Mark 2

Iran 
 Bavar 373
 Ya Zahra
 Raad 
 Mehrab
 Shahin
 Shalamche
 Misagh-1
 Misagh-2
 Qaem
 Taer-I
 Taer-II A, B and S
 Talaash air defense system
 Sayyad-1
 Sayyad-1A
 Sayyad-2
 Sayyad-3
 Sayyad-4
 Khordad 15 (air defense system)
 Kamin-2
 Shahab Thaqeb
 SM-1
 Herz-e-nohom
 Tabas
 Sevom Khordad
 Raad 122 mm anti helicopter rocket

Iraq 
 Al Arq (missile)
 Al Hurriyah (missile)

Israel 
 Arrow 2
 Arrow 3
 Barak 1
 Barak 8
 David's Sling (Stunner missile)
 Iron Dome
 SPYDER (Surface-to-Air Python and Derby)

Italy 
 Aspide
 CAMM-ER "Common Anti-aircraft Modular Missile - Extended Range"
 Aster 15
 Aster 30

Japan 
 Type 91
 Type 03 Chu-SAM
 Type 81 Tan-SAM
 Type 93 "Closed Arrow" SAM
 Type 11 Tan-SAM Kai II

Myanmar 

 GYD-1B(KS-1M) medium-range surface-to-air missile

Poland 

 GROM
 Piorun
 Poprad (Grom, Piorun missiles) land-based VSHORAD system

Romania 
 CA-94
 CA-95

South Africa 
 Umkhonto
 Marlin

South Korea 
 Chiron
 KM-SAM

Sweden 
 MSHORAD (Bolide missile) land-based VSHORAD 
 RBS-70
 RBS-23

Switzerland 
 RSA
 RSC-54
 RSC-56
 RSC-57
 RSC/RSD 58
 RSE Kriens

Taiwan 
 Sky Bow I 
 Sky Bow II 
 Sky Bow III

Turkey 
 HİSAR
 PMADSnaval/land-based VSHORAD system
 SIPER (Long range surface to air missile system)

Ukraine 
 Dnipro

United Kingdom 
 Thunderbird (missile)
 Blowpipe
 Bristol Bloodhound
 Javelin
 Rapier
 Sea Cat – United Kingdom
 Sea Slug
 Sea Dart
 Sea Wolf
 Starstreak/laser 
 Starburst/laser
 CAMM (missile family)

United States 
 AN/TWQ-1 Avenger
 Aegis Ballistic Missile Defense System
 FIM-43 Redeye
 FIM-92 Stinger
 MIM-3 Nike Ajax
 MIM-14 Nike-Hercules
 CIM-10 BOMARC
 MIM-23 Hawk
 MIM-72 Chaparral – This is a ground-launched version of the AIM-9 Sidewinder AAM
 MIM-104 Patriot 
 RIM-24 Tartar
 RIM-2 Terrier
 RIM-8 Talos
 RIM-7 Sea Sparrow (aka Basic Point Defense Missile System) (BPDMS)
 RIM-50 Typhon
 RIM-66 Standard (SM-1MR/SM-2MR)
 RIM-67 Standard (SM-1ER/SM-2ER)
 RIM-113
 RIM-116 Rolling Airframe Missile
 RIM-161 Standard Missile 3 (SM-3)
 RIM-162 ESSM
 RIM-174 Standard ERAM (SM-6)
 Terminal High Altitude Area Defense (THAAD)

USSR/Russian Federation 

 2K11 Krug/SA-4 "Ganef"
 2K12 Kub/SA-6 "Gainful"
 2K22 Tunguska/SA-19 "Grison"/SA-N-11 (tracked gun-missile system including SA-19)
 Kashtan CIWS (naval gun-missile system including SA-19/SA-N-11)
 9K33 Osa/SA-8 "Gecko"/SA-N-4
 9K31 Strela-1/SA-9 "Gaskin"
 9K32 Strela-2, a.k.a. SA-7 Grail
 9K34 Strela-3/SA-14 "Gremlin"/SA-N-8
 9K38 Igla/SA-16 "Gimlet"/SA-18 "Grouse"/SA-24 "Grinch"/SA-N-10/SA-N-14
 9K333 Verba
 9K35 Strela-10/SA-13 "Gopher"
 9K37 Buk/SA-11 "Gadfly"/SA-17 "Grizzly"/SA-N-7/SA-N-12
 Pantsir-S1/SA-22 "Greyhound" (wheeled or tracked gun-missile system including SA-22)
 9K330 Tor/SA-15 "Gauntlet"/SA-N-9
 42S6 Morfey
 S-25 Berkut/SA-1 "Guild"
 S-75 Dvina/SA-2 "Guideline"/SA-N-2
 S-125 Neva/Pechora/SA-3 "Goa"/SA-N-1
 S-200 Angara/Vega/Dubna/SA-5 "Gammon"
 S-300/SA-10 "Grumble"/SA-12 "Gladiator/Giant"/SA-20 "Gargoyle"/SA-N-6
 S-300VM/SA-23 "Gladiator/Giant" 
 S-350E Vityaz 50R6
 S-400 Triumf/SA-21 "Growler"
 S-500 55R6M "Triumfator-M." (As of September 16, 2021)
 M-11 Shtorm/SA-N-3 "Goblet"
 9M337 Sosna-R

North Korea 
 KN-06

Yugoslavia 
 R-25 Vulkan

Multinational 
 ASGLA (Igla missile) (German-Ukrainian) land-based VSHORAD system
 ASRAD-R (Bolide missile) (German-Swedish) land-based VSHORAD system
 ASRAD-R Naval (Bolide missile) (German-Swedish) shipboard VSHORAD system
 IRIS-T SL (German-Italian-Swedish-Greek-Norwegian-Spanish)
 Falcon (IRIS-T SL missile) (German-Swedish-American) land-based SHORAD system
 MGBADS (IRIS-T SL missile) (German-Danish-Norwegian) land-based SHORAD system
 LVRBS-98 (IRIS-T SL missile) (German-Swedish) land-based SHORAD system
 IDAS (German-Norwegian-Turkish) submarine-launched anti-air/ship/land missile – also infrared-guided
 ForceSHIELD (Starstreak missile) (Franco-British) land-based VSHORAD system
 MEADS (PAC-3 MSE missile) (German-Italian-American) (cancelled) land-based MRAD system
 MIM-115 Roland (Franco-German) (replaced by LFK NG)
 MIM-146 ADATS (Swiss-American)
 NASAMS (AMRAAM missile) (Norwegian-American) land-based SHORAD system
 NASAMS 2 (AMRAAM missile) (Norwegian-American) land-based SHORAD system
 NASAMS 3 (AMRAAM missile) (Norwegian-American) land-based SHORAD system
 PAAMS / Sea Viper (MBDA Aster missile) (Franco-British-Italian) shipboard SHORAD/MRAD system
 SAMP/T (MBDA Aster missile) (Franco-Italian) land-based SHORAD/MRAD system
 RIM-116 Rolling Airframe Missile – United States / Germany (also has initial passive radar (ESM) guidance)
 TLVS (PAC-3 MSE, IRIS-T SL missiles) (German-American) land-based SHORAD/MRAD system
 Barak 1 developed by India and Israel 
 Barak 8 developed by India and Israel

References

Anti-aircraft weapons
Lists of weapons